Deh Malek or Deh-e Malek or Dehmalek, also rendered as Deh Malik, may refer to:
Deh-e Malek, Fars
Deh-e Malek, Kerman
Deh Malek, Rabor, Kerman Province

See also
 Malek, Iran (disambiguation)